...And His Mother Called Him Bill is a studio album by Duke Ellington recorded in the wake of the 1967 death of his long-time collaborator, Billy Strayhorn. It won the Grammy Award for Best Large Jazz Ensemble Album in 1968.

Background
Ellington recorded the album as a tribute to Billy Strayhorn, who died of cancer in May 1967. Strayhorn was a composer, arranger, and one of Ellington's closest friends.

Recording and music
The album was recorded in August and November 1967. The material is Strayhorn's compositions, including some that had not previously been recorded. Ellington chose the songs to demonstrate Strayhorn's versatility and range, as well as to pay homage to the qualities that he most admired in his late writing partner.

"Blood Count" was Strayhorn's last composition, written for the Ellington Orchestra's 1967 concert at Carnegie Hall. Another piece with a medical-related title is "U.M.M.G.", short for 'Upper Manhattan Medical Group'. The 1951 composition "Rock Skippin' at the Blue Note" showcases Cootie Williams, Jimmy Hamilton, and John Sanders.

Reception

...And His Mother Called Him Bill won the Grammy Award for Best Large Jazz Ensemble Album in 1969. The AllMusic reviewer wrote that, "For a man who issued well over 300 albums, this set is among his most profoundly felt and very finest recorded moments."
As the band was packing up to leave the session, Ellington remained at the piano, pouring his heart out on Strayhorn's "Lotus Blossom."  Fortunately, the mic was open and the tape deck still running.

Track listing
All compositions by Billy Strayhorn except where noted

Side A
 Snibor - 4:13
 Boo-Dah - 3:26
 Blood Count - 4:16
 U.M.M.G. - 3:13
 Charpoy - 3:06
 After All - 3:51

Side B
 The Intimacy of the Blues - 2:57
 Raincheck - 4:35
 Day Dream - 4:23 (Strayhorn-Ellington)
 Rock Skippin' at the Blue Note - 3:01
 All Day Long - 2:56
 Lotus Blossom - 3:54
 Acht O'Clock Rock - 2:21 (Ellington)

Bonus Tracks
 Raincheck (Take 4) - 5:22
 Smada (Take 3) - 3:20 (Strayhorn-Ellington)
 Smada (Take 4) - 3:18
 Midriff - 4:34
 My Little Brown Book - 4:11
 Lotus Blossom (Piano Solo) - 4:55

Personnel
 Duke Ellington – piano
 Mercer Ellington – trumpet
 Cat Anderson – trumpet
 Herbie Jones – trumpet
 Cootie Williams – trumpet
 Clark Terry – flugelhorn
 Lawrence Brown – trombone
 Buster Cooper – trombone
 Chuck Connors – bass trombone
 John Sanders – valve trombone
 Johnny Hodges – alto saxophone
 Russell Procope – clarinet and alto saxophone
 Jimmy Hamilton – clarinet and tenor saxophone
 Paul Gonsalves – tenor saxophone
 Harry Carney – baritone saxophone
 Aaron Bell – double bass
 Jeff Castleman – double bass
 Steve Little – drums
 Sam Woodyard – drums

References

Duke Ellington albums
1967 albums
Bluebird Records albums
RCA Records albums
Instrumental albums
Grammy Award for Best Large Jazz Ensemble Album